The Italian general election of 2006 took place on 10–11 April 2006. The election was won in Veneto by the centre-right House of Freedoms coalition by a landslide in an election narrowly won by the centre-left The Union at the national level.

Results

Chamber of Deputies

|-
|- bgcolor="#E9E9E9"
!rowspan="1" align="left" valign="top"|Coalition leader
!rowspan="1" align="center" valign="top"|votes
!rowspan="1" align="center" valign="top"|votes (%)
!rowspan="1" align="center" valign="top"|seats
!rowspan="1" align="left" valign="top"|Party
!rowspan="1" align="center" valign="top"|votes
!rowspan="1" align="center" valign="top"|votes (%)
!rowspan="1" align="center" valign="top"|seats
|-
!rowspan="7" align="left" valign="top"|Silvio Berlusconi
|rowspan="7" valign="top"|1,789,452
|rowspan="7" valign="top"|56.3
|rowspan="7" valign="top"|26

|align="left"|Forza Italia
|valign="top"|779,602
|valign="top"|24.5
|valign="top"|12
|-
|align="left"|National Alliance
|valign="top"|358,648
|valign="top"|11.3
|valign="top"|5
|-
|align="left"|Lega Nord
|valign="top"|353,284
|valign="top"|11.1
|valign="top"|5
|-
|align="left"|Union of Christian and Centre Democrats
|valign="top"|247,327
|valign="top"|7.8
|valign="top"|4
|-
|align="left"|Social Alternative
|valign="top"|18,968
|valign="top"|0.6
|valign="top"|-
|-
|align="left"|Christian Democracy–Socialist Party
|valign="top"|16,088
|valign="top"|0.5
|valign="top"|-
|-
|align="left"|others
|valign="top"|15,535
|valign="top"|0.5
|valign="top"|-

|-
!rowspan="10" align="left" valign="top"|Romano Prodi
|rowspan="10" valign="top"|1,236,161
|rowspan="10" valign="top"|40.4
|rowspan="10" valign="top"|23

|align="left"|The Olive Tree
Democracy is Freedom – The Daisy
Democrats of the Left
|valign="top"|848,830
|valign="top"|26.7
|valign="top"|16
|-
|align="left"|Communist Refoundation Party
|valign="top"|124,081
|valign="top"|3.9
|valign="top"|2
|-
|align="left"|Italy of Values
|valign="top"|69,870
|valign="top"|2.2
|valign="top"|2
|-
|align="left"|Rose in the Fist
Italian Democratic Socialists
Italian Radicals
|valign="top"|68,876
|valign="top"|2.2
|valign="top"|2
|-
|align="left"|Federation of the Greens
|valign="top"|59,301
|valign="top"|1.9
|valign="top"|1
|-
|align="left"|Party of Italian Communists
|valign="top"|45,197
|valign="top"|1.4
|valign="top"|-
|-
|align="left"|Liga Fronte Veneto
|valign="top"|22,010
|valign="top"|0.7
|valign="top"|-
|-
|align="left"|Pensioners' Party
|valign="top"|21,048
|valign="top"|0.7
|valign="top"|-
|-
|align="left"|Populars–UDEUR
|valign="top"|14,743
|valign="top"|0.5
|valign="top"|-
|-
|align="left"|others
|valign="top"|6,225
|valign="top"|0.2
|valign="top"|-

|-
!rowspan="1" align="left" valign="top"|Giorgio Panto
|rowspan="1" valign="top"|86,824
|rowspan="1" valign="top"|2.7
|rowspan="1" valign="top"|-

|align="left"|North-East Project
|valign="top"|86,824
|valign="top"|2.7
|valign="top"|-
|-
!rowspan="1" align="left" valign="top"|Others
|rowspan="1" valign="top"|7,181
|rowspan="1" valign="top"|0.2
|rowspan="1" valign="top"|-

|align="left"|others
|valign="top"|7,181
|valign="top"|0.2
|valign="top"|-

|-
|- bgcolor="#E9E9E9"
!rowspan="1" align="left" valign="top"|Total coalitions
!rowspan="1" align="right" valign="top"|3,184,017
!rowspan="1" align="right" valign="top"|100.0
!rowspan="1" align="right" valign="top"|49
!rowspan="1" align="left" valign="top"|Total parties
!rowspan="1" align="right" valign="top"|3,184,017
!rowspan="1" align="right" valign="top"|100.0
!rowspan="1" align="right" valign="top"|49
|}
Source: Regional Council of Veneto

Senate

|-
|- bgcolor="#E9E9E9"
!rowspan="1" align="left" valign="top"|Coalition leader
!rowspan="1" align="center" valign="top"|votes
!rowspan="1" align="center" valign="top"|votes (%)
!rowspan="1" align="center" valign="top"|seats
!rowspan="1" align="left" valign="top"|Party
!rowspan="1" align="center" valign="top"|votes
!rowspan="1" align="center" valign="top"|votes (%)
!rowspan="1" align="center" valign="top"|seats
|-
!rowspan="8" align="left" valign="top"|Silvio Berlusconi
|rowspan="8" valign="top"|1,673,791
|rowspan="8" valign="top"|57.1
|rowspan="8" valign="top"|14

|align="left"|Forza Italia
|valign="top"|720,749
|valign="top"|24.6
|valign="top"|6
|-
|align="left"|National Alliance
|valign="top"|336,374
|valign="top"|11.5
|valign="top"|3
|-
|align="left"|Lega Nord
|valign="top"|321,992
|valign="top"|11.0
|valign="top"|3
|-
|align="left"|Union of Christian and Centre Democrats
|valign="top"|231,240
|valign="top"|7.9
|valign="top"|2
|-
|align="left"|Social Alternative
|valign="top"|16,229
|valign="top"|0.5
|valign="top"|-
|-
|align="left"|Christian Democracy–Socialist Party
|valign="top"|15,415
|valign="top"|0.5
|valign="top"|-
|-
|align="left"|Tricolour Flame
|valign="top"|14,375
|valign="top"|0.5
|valign="top"|-
|-
|align="left"|others
|valign="top"|17,417
|valign="top"|0.6
|valign="top"|-

|-
!rowspan="10" align="left" valign="top"|Romano Prodi
|rowspan="10" valign="top"|1,158,534
|rowspan="10" valign="top"|39.6
|rowspan="10" valign="top"|10

|align="left"|Democracy is Freedom – The Daisy
|valign="top"|348,670
|valign="top"|11.9
|valign="top"|4
|-
|align="left"|Democrats of the Left
|valign="top"|336,278
|valign="top"|11.5
|valign="top"|4
|-
|align="left"|Communist Refoundation Party
|valign="top"|144,502
|valign="top"|4.9
|valign="top"|1
|-
|align="left"|Together with the Union
Federation of the Greens
Party of Italian Communists
|valign="top"|111,417
|valign="top"|3.8
|valign="top"|1
|-
|align="left"|Italy of Values
|valign="top"|83,931
|valign="top"|2.9
|valign="top"|-
|-
|align="left"|Rose in the Fist
Italian Democratic Socialists
Italian Radicals
|valign="top"|61,527
|valign="top"|2.1
|valign="top"|-
|-
|align="left"|Pensioners' Party
|valign="top"|23,446
|valign="top"|0.8
|valign="top"|-
|-
|align="left"|Liga Fronte Veneto
|valign="top"|23,208
|valign="top"|0.8
|valign="top"|-
|-
|align="left"|Populars–UDEUR
|valign="top"|14,723
|valign="top"|0.5
|valign="top"|-
|-
|align="left"|others
|valign="top"|10,832
|valign="top"|0.4
|valign="top"|-

|-
!rowspan="1" align="left" valign="top"|Giorgio Panto
|rowspan="1" valign="top"|87,601
|rowspan="1" valign="top"|3.0
|rowspan="1" valign="top"|-

|align="left"|North-East Project
|valign="top"|87,601
|valign="top"|3.0
|valign="top"|-
|-
!rowspan="1" align="left" valign="top"|Others
|rowspan="1" valign="top"|11,293
|rowspan="1" valign="top"|0.3
|rowspan="1" valign="top"|-

|align="left"|others
|valign="top"|11,293
|valign="top"|0.3
|valign="top"|-

|-
|- bgcolor="#E9E9E9"
!rowspan="1" align="left" valign="top"|Total coalitions
!rowspan="1" align="right" valign="top"|2,931,210
!rowspan="1" align="right" valign="top"|100.0
!rowspan="1" align="right" valign="top"|24
!rowspan="1" align="left" valign="top"|Total parties
!rowspan="1" align="right" valign="top"|2,931,210
!rowspan="1" align="right" valign="top"|100.0
!rowspan="1" align="right" valign="top"|24
|}
Source: Regional Council of Veneto

Elections in Veneto
General, Veneto